Donald Lawrence O'Toole (August 1, 1902 – September 12, 1964) was an American lawyer and politician who served eight terms as a United States representative from New York from 1937 to 1953.

Biography 
Born in Brooklyn, he attended public and parochial schools, graduated from St. James Academy in Brooklyn in 1916, and from the law department of Fordham University in 1925. He was a postgraduate student at Columbia University and New York University, then was admitted to the bar in 1927, commencing practice in New York City.

Political career  
He was a member of the board of aldermen from 1934 to 1936.

Congress 
He was elected as a Democrat to the Seventy-fifth and to the seven succeeding Congresses, holding office from January 3, 1937, to January 3, 1953. He was an unsuccessful candidate for reelection in 1952 to the Eighty-third Congress and for election in 1954 to the Eighty-fourth Congress and resumed the practice of law.

Later career and death 
He also served as executive director of New York State Department of Commerce and Industry from 1955 to 1957 and commissioner of the department from August 1, 1958, to April 29, 1959.

A resident of Brooklyn, he died in Ocala, Florida, in 1964. Interment was in Holy Cross Cemetery, Brooklyn.

References

1902 births
1964 deaths
Politicians from Brooklyn
Fordham University School of Law alumni
New York (state) lawyers
Democratic Party members of the United States House of Representatives from New York (state)
20th-century American lawyers
20th-century American politicians